Aebersold is a surname of German and Swiss origin. People with this surname include:

 Christian Aebersold (born 1962), Swiss orienteer
 Jamey Aebersold (born 1939), American jazz saxophonist
 Jane Ford Aebersold (born 1941), American ceramist
 Niki Aebersold (born 1972), Swiss cyclist
 Ruedi Aebersold (born 1954), Swiss biologist
 Simona Aebersold (born 1998), Swiss orienteer

Aebersold may also refer to a series of Jazz Improvisation books called Aebersold Play-A-Long.

References 

Swiss-German surnames